Pseudotephritis vau is a species of picture-winged fly in the family Ulidiidae.

Distribution
Canada, United States.

References

Insects described in 1830
Ulidiidae
Diptera of North America
Taxa named by Thomas Say